Kevin Mangold is an American actor, stuntman, editor, producer and former horse jockey. He appeared most famously in the film Seabiscuit.

Filmography

Film

Television

References

External links

Year of birth missing (living people)
Living people
American male film actors
American jockeys